Shifta is a term used in East Africa meaning rebel, outlaw, bandit, vigilante, brigand, or patriot originally having a heroic or anti-heroic connotation rather than a villainous characteristic similar to the legendary heroic romanticization of the outlaw Robin Hood in Western Society but over time, especially today, it has taken on a more villainous connotation.  It is a term mostly used in Ethiopia, Eritrea, Kenya, Tanzania, and Somalia. The Swahili word was loaned from the Somali shufta during the Shifta War, which is in turn derived from Amharic ሽፍታ (šəfta). Historically, the shifta served as a local militia in particularly remote, rural and often lawless parts of the Horn of Africa. The word shifta can be translated as "bandit" or "outlaw", but can include anyone who rebels against an authority or an institution that is seen as illegitimate, like the Arbegnoch guerillas during the Italian occupation of Ethiopia.

Concept
The term shifta has positive and negative connotations, that of a common bandit and that of a revolutionary; both concepts being distinct, but not necessarily mutually exclusive. They are often considered as highly respected, politically minded outlaws struggling for social order or a political cause. When applied in this context, shiftinnet (being a shifta) in its diverse forms has a social function as a form of conflict resolution.

In Eritrea, during the British administration, military units were used to police the lawless areas and stop common shifta activity.

In Ethiopia, individuals who started as shifta have risen to the level of warlord or Emperor thus legitimizing the concept of shifta itself. Two nineteenth-century shiftas, Kassa Hailu of Gondar and Kassa Mercha of Tigray, became Emperor Tewodros and Emperor Yohannes respectively in the late 19th century. Thus the shiftas formed the military elite and became the core of the resistance, using their military skills against the Italians. Conventionally however, a shifta whose acts trespassed social norms would be called t'era-shifta and would be regarded as a thief or bandit. The Italians labelled all shiftas as t'era-shiftas, of the criminal type. Nevertheless, to be described as a shifta, especially during the Italian occupation, was an honour for an Ethiopian and this was how resistance started and spread. 

In recent times, both prime ministers Isaias Afewerki of Eritrea and Meles Zenawi of Ethiopia were called shifta when they served, respectively, as rebel leaders of the EPLF and TPLF, along with members of the Amhara ethnic nationalist Fano.

See also 
 Brigandage
 Shifta War, (1963–1967) in northeastern Kenya
 Klepht, a similar status in Greece.

References and notes

Horn of Africa
Outlaws
Rebels